The Bundesstraße 2 (abbr. B2) is Germany's longest federal highway, running some 1000 kilometres from the Polish border near Gartz to the Austrian border near Garmisch-Partenkirchen. From north to south; it passes through major cities such as Berlin, Potsdam, Leipzig, Gera, Bayreuth, Nuremberg, Augsburg, and Munich. It is largely paralleled by Bundesautobahn 9, and a small portion coincides with Bundesautobahn 952.

It corresponds to a long portion of the Via Imperii of the Holy Roman Empire which continued all the way to Venice via the Brenner Pass. In Berlin B2 forms among others the following squares and streets Alexanderplatz, Karl-Liebknecht-Straße, Unter den Linden, Straße des 17. Juni, Großer Stern, Kaiserdamm, Theodor-Heuss-Platz, and Heerstraße.

Roads in Brandenburg
Roads in Berlin
Roads in Saxony
Roads in Saxony-Anhalt
Roads in Thuringia
Roads in Bavaria
002